Nathan Drake may refer to:

Nathan Drake (artist) (c. 1728–1778), English artist
Nathan Drake (essayist) (1766–1836), his son, English Shakespearian essayist and physician
Nathan Drake (Uncharted), the protagonist of the Uncharted video game series